also known as Ode to the Yakuza is a 1970 Japanese film directed by Yasuzo Masumura. Katsu and Masumura worked together for the first in 5 years. It is based on Jūgo Kuroiwa's novel Nishi Naruyama Hotel Gake no Hana. The movie depicts a man's unusual love for a younger sister.

Tatematsu Minoru is a Yakuza in Shinjuku. He has younger sister Akane. Akane comes to like Yuji but Minoru threatens Yuji to break up with Akane. Because Minoru loves his younger sister abnormally.

Cast
 Shintaro Katsu as Tatematsu Minoru
 Masakazu Tamura as Inumaru Yuji
 Naoko Otani as Tatematsu Akane
 Yoshi Katō as Inumaru Yasusuke
 Yūsuke Kawazu as Kaizuka Shigetarō
 Chikara Hashimoto as Kiyama
 Kiwako Taichi as Kanae
 Sei Hiraizumi as Hisai

References

External links
 

Daiei Film films
1970s Japanese films